Vatslava Havela is a station on the Kyiv Light Rail in Kyiv, Ukraine. It was opened in 1977.
Before 2018 station was called Ivana Lepse

References

External links
 

Kyiv Light Rail stations